Jaspreet Kaur is an Indian film producer. She produced Bengali film C/O Sir in 2013. She is the founder and CEO of KR Movies and Entertainment, an Indian Film and Television Production House that produces and distributes movies, interactive television and online content. She had produced other Bengali Films, including Bawal in 2015 and Cholai in 2016. She is producing a documentary on Irom Chanu Sharmila titled The Turning Point. Her next venture will be a book adaption of Vanara: The Legend of Baali, Sugreeva and Tara, Author Anand Neelakantan.

Career
A computer science engineer by training along with her hobby in VFX and animation, Jaspreet resigned her job with a multinational company in order to join Vancouver Film School to pursue film making.

She returned to India to work for Mumbai and Hyderabad, such as Prime Focus, Reliance Media Works, Firefly and Prana; initially she worked as a Senior Compositor, and subsequently as a VFX Producer for dozens of Hollywood, Bollywood, and Indian regional productions.

Jaspreet set up her own film production House to tell stories she felt strongly about. When KR Movies made their first theatrical release (C/O Sir) in 2013 with a National Award-winning director, Jaspreet was the youngest female producer in Eastern India. C/O Sir became the first Bengali Film to have a theatrical release in Singapore.

Cholai premiered at Cannes Film Festival 2016 and was nominated in six categories (winning Best Supporting Actress) in Madrid Film Festival 2016 including Best Film, Best Supporting Actress and Best Director. She is co-creator of one-of-a-kind interactive TV series based on Motion Capture and 3D animation.

Apart from handling operations at KR Movies, Kaur's role in her projects include securing funds, working with co-producers, investors and distributors. She was executive producer of her projects, contributing significantly to assembling the right team, overall program management and oversight. She often continues to get closely involved in VFX production, costume design, art direction and editing.

Filmography

Producer

Recognition
Cholai was awarded two Filmfare awards in Jio Filmfare Awards (East) 2017. It won for Best Dialogue (Subhomay Chatterjee) and Critics' Best Film (Arun Roy).

References

Living people
Indian women film producers
Bengali film producers
Year of birth missing (living people)